Tyson Langelaar (born 17 February 1999) is a Canadian long track speed skater who specializes in the 1000m and 1500m distances.

Career
In February 2017, Langelaar won the bronze medal at the 2017 World Junior Speed Skating Championships in Helsinki, Finland. At the 2018 World Junior Speed Skating Championships in Utah, United States he finished second overall behind Allan Dahl Johansson.

In 2019 he turned professional. Langelaar finished fifth in the 1500m race at the 2019–20 ISU World Cup No. 2 in Tomaszów Mazowiecki.

Personal records

References

External links
ISU profile
Speed Skating Canada profile
SpeedSkatingNews profile

1999 births
Living people
Canadian male speed skaters
Speed skaters from Winnipeg
Speed skaters at the 2022 Winter Olympics
Olympic speed skaters of Canada
21st-century Canadian people